Matilda Mann is a British indie folk musician from London. 

Mann released her first EP in 2019 titled If That Makes Sense. The EP led her to open for some notable musicians including Arlo Parks, Beabadoobee, and The Staves. In September 2020, Mann released a new song titled Happy Anniversary Stranger. The song was the first song released from Mann's then upcoming EP. The EP, titled Because I Wanted You To Know, was released in November 2021. In 2021, Mann released her third EP titled Sonder. Mann released the song "Doomsday" in April 2021. In February 2022, Mann released a new song titled Four Leaf Dream. Mann released another new song in April 2022 titled "Nice". Mann's most recent release are two singles, "Hell" and "Margaux".

References

External links

Musicians from London
21st-century English women musicians
Year of birth missing (living people)
Living people